The 1879 Wisconsin gubernatorial election was held on November 4, 1879. Incumbent Republican Governor William E. Smith ran for re-election to a second term. The Democratic convention initially nominated Alexander Mitchell for Governor, but Mitchell declined the nomination; in his place, Milwaukee attorney James Graham Jenkins received the nomination. Smith and Jenkins also faced a Greenback candidate and a nominee from the nascent Prohibition Party in the general election. Jenkins ultimately won re-election in a landslide, winning 53% of the vote Jenkins's 40%. Reuben May, the Greenback nominee, received only 7% of the vote, a significant erosion from the Party's 15% in 1877.

General election

References

Bibliography
 

1879
Wisconsin
1879 Wisconsin elections